The Tunisia national American football team, nicknamed Les Aigles de Carthage (The Eagles of Carthage or The Carthage Eagles), represents Tunisia in international American football competitions.

History

Founding and Membership of IFAF
The Association Tunisienne de Football Américain (AFTA) was founded in 2017, and it is the governing body for the sport of American football in Tunisia. It is responsible for all regulatory, competition, performance and development aspects of the game.

The Tunisian National team of American football
It is the country's official senior national men's football team. It is controlled by AFTA and is recognized by the International Federation of American Football (IFAF).

AFTA is a full member of the International Federation of American Football.

AFTA offers full-contact football in Tunisia. The association offers a number of training sessions, open try-outs, and skills camps.

On 3 November  2017 they played their first match ever against Monarques de Saint-Denis.

IFAF World Championship

IFAF World Championship record

See also
 Tunisia national football team
 Tunisia national minifootball team
 Tunisia national futsal team
 Tunisia national beach soccer team

References

External links

 

International Federation of American Football
American football
American football in Tunisia
Men's national American football teams